Sheep in the Big City is an American animated television series created by Mo Willems for Cartoon Network, and the 9th of the network's Cartoon Cartoons. The series' pilot first premiered as part of Cartoon Network's "Cartoon Cartoon Summer" on August 18, 2000, before its official debut on November 17, 2000.

Willems previously created The Off-Beats for Nickelodeon's KaBlam! before working on this animated show. The series follows a runaway sheep named Sheep in his new life in "the Big City", where he tries to avoid a secret military organization. It also features several unrelated sketches and shorts, similar to those from The Adventures of Rocky and Bullwinkle and Friends. With an emphasis on sophisticated (in particular, literal) humor, using different forms of rhetoric from characters to plots, it included comic references to filmmaking and television broadcasting.

At the time, the premiere of Sheep in the Big City was the highest-rated premiere for a Cartoon Network original series.

The animation services for the series were handled by the Korean animation studio Rough Draft Korea. This was Cartoon Network's first original series produced by the animation studio Curious Pictures, who would later go on to produce Codename: Kids Next Door in 2002.

Premise
Sheep lives happily on a farm with his friends. Unfortunately, a Secret Military Organization, led by General Specific, needs Sheep for its Sheep-Powered Ray Gun (with a sheep-shaped hole in it).

General Specific will get Sheep at any cost, and, knowing that the farm is at stake, Sheep is forced to leave for the big city. Now Sheep is on the run from General Specific, who is assisted by his henchmen, Private Public, the Angry Scientist (who in the show is often wrongly referred to as "Mad Scientist"), a bunch of other military types, and the Plot Device.

In addition, Sheep has to come to grips with the Big City and trying to romance his love, Swanky the Poodle. All the while, he has to avoid the attentions of a host of unwelcome characters — Lisa Rentel and Swanky's owner, the sheep-hating Lady Richington, wielding a stainless-steel wig.

Characters
 Sheep (voiced by Kevin Seal) is an anthropomorphic sheep, who is the main protagonist of the series. He is owned by Farmer John, who named him Sheep due to the fact that he was a plucky little sheep. Sheep has a hard time with life—between getting chased by the military and trying to see Swanky the Poodle, the poodle that Sheep loves, without getting bonked on the head by Lady Richington with her stainless steel wig. Yet, he still makes time to act in dish-washing commercials, travel through time, get a job at a hip club, and also makes a living jumping over fences for insomniacs. Sheep bleats but does not speak in any intelligible human language. As he is a normal sheep, aside from possibly higher intelligence, he has trouble resisting his animal urges, such as eating grass, even when he is being chased by General Specific.
 General Specific (voiced by Kevin Seal) is the main antagonist of the series. The ruthless and ambitious leader of the Secret Military Organization, Specific does his best to capture Sheep for his Sheep-Powered Ray Gun. He is never discouraged by his constant losses. Specific always speaks through his clenched teeth. He mentions in one episode that he has a steel plate in his head. In one episode, he also developed the habit of throwing his subordinates into "The Pit" (a trapdoor, appearing out of nowhere under the characters' feet) (he once did it to the subordinate who asked him why he does not simply catch some random sheep and make the Sheep-Powered Ray Gun compatible to it), but later, finds out that this is a problem, when neither he nor Private Public can maneuver the helicopter properly, because Specific dropped the helicopter pilot into the Pit. General Specific's name is an oxymoron. On his uniform, he has 3 medals that look like exclamation marks, and one that looks like a question mark.
 Farmer John (voiced by James Godwin) is Sheep's original owner, also seeking to recapture him—although in a more mild-mannered way than General Specific. In one episode, it is revealed that "Far" and "Mer" are actually Farmer John's first and middle name, not his job description. According to Dirk and Sondra's reenacting of Farmer John's parents naming him, he was named "Far" after his father's desire to know how "far" he goes in life and "Mer" after a relative of Farmer John's father. Sondra also jokingly suggested (albeit it's unclear if she said it on her own or if she was still acting as Farmer John's mother) that Farmer John could be named 'Elton'. Both Dirk and Sondra laughed at the suggestion. Farmer John's personality is best described that, in order not to kill any of his farm animals, he prepares water soup for the re-union. He is constantly using pseudo-psychological talk, which is, in fact, extremely boring and instead of "helping", it forces the characters not to pay attention to him. Another example of his annoyance is his "thanks" speech at the re-union, where he thanks for everything, including "air" and "silly shoes". He sometimes calls Sheep "Sheepie".
 Ben Plotz (voiced by Ken Schatz) is the show's narrator. He often complains about the quality of the writing on the show, but overall, he has an appreciation for the cast. He, on one occasion, embellishes the storyline when he dislikes the ending. Other times, he is forced to make changes to the show by Irv to preserve the show's budget.
 Private Public (voiced by James Edmund Godwin) is General Specific's right-hand man. He is always right behind General Specific, and despite being much smarter, he would prefer to receive orders than give them. His name is also oxymoronic.
 The Angry Scientist (voiced by Mo Willems) often gets his hump busted for being an Angry Scientist rather than Mad, but he is the brains behind the organization, despite his extremely limited grasp of the English language (referring to it with the phrase "Why are you not my Englishness be understanding? All the timing with that"). His inventions include the Sheep-Powered Ray Gun, the Clome, and a Time-Travel Bicycle (although Private Public flatly points out that if he can invent a time machine why cannot he invent a ray gun that works without a sheep). He often goes into fits of rage at General Specific when he calls him a 'Mad Scientist' ("ANGURY!! I am an ANGURY Scientist!!"), and on one occasion, he is called the 'Angry Chemist'. At the end of Season 1, he considers calling himself "The Scientist with Some Issues", now getting angry whenever he gets referred as "The Angry Scientist". He's mistakenly called 'Mad Scientist' so often that, in one occasion, he complained about it out of habit when he was called 'Angry Scientist'. He once opened an anger management center where he taught people to become angrier. General Specific used to be one of his clients until he said the center made him madder, making the Angry Scientist expel him, claiming it was an 'Anger Management Center' and not a 'Madness Management Center'. General Specific was so angry for being expelled The Angry Scientist considered him another satisfied customer.
 The Plot Device (voiced by Stephanie D'Abruzzo) is a machine that comes up with plans for General Specific, such as disguising sleep potion as water soup to sneak into Farmer John's house. Her name is a pun as her main role in the stories is as a plot device.
 General Lee Outrageous (voiced by Joey Mazzarino) is General Specific's cousin, who is a stereotypical 1970s disco partier. He is nearly identical to Specific, but has sunglasses, shiny clothing, blue hair shaped into a ponytail, a gold tooth and three stars on his hat, as opposed to Specific's one star. Lee is also Specific's rival, and uses a goat-powered ray-gun. He has a sidekick called Private Party, who is similar to Private Public and could be his cousin. His name is a pun on "generally outrageous".
 Lady Virginia Richington (voiced by Ruth Buzzi in the pilot and Stephanie D'Abruzzo in the series) is the owner of Swanky. Lady Richington, of the Filthy Richingtons, is quite rich. She owns the majority of the city and is never seen without her gaudy jewellery and lavish clothing. While she may not look very intimidating, she has a severe hatred of sheep in general, and will not hesitate to pummel them into fluffy pulps with her stainless steel wig.
 Lisa Rentel (voiced by Stephanie D'Abruzzo) is an annoying, evil little girl, who thinks that Sheep is a "cutesy wootsey dog" and wants him desperately. Lisa also loves to refer to Sheep as "Doggy Woggy Smoggy Foggy Loggy Toggy Doggy". Her name is a pun on the words "lease a rental". When she and General Specific first met, she convinced him that Sheep was a dog by having Sheep obey her commands (not knowing her true colors back then, Sheep played along) and telling him Sheep was a sheep dog.
 X Agent is a black-woollen sheep whom General Specific hired in order to capture Sheep. X Agent becomes best friends with Sheep and, after feeling remorse for betraying Sheep, betrays Specific and becomes a Batman-like superhero. In another episode, he becomes an overprotective guardian of Sheep. He leaves after Completely Powerful Guy reads a telegram from "The Writer", informing X Agent that he has been assigned to Toledo, Ohio, and that the request is not "just a convenient way of getting you out of this show". Like Sheep, X Agent bleats and does not speak in intelligible human language.
 Oxymoron is an ox who debuted in numerous "Phony Bologna" advertisements for the Oxymoron company. He also makes cameos in some episodes. His name is a parody of oxymoron, a phrase in which an adjective that means the opposite of the noun that it describes is used (e.g. a smart idiot, a planned coincidence, Hopeless Optimistic, etc.).
 Victor (voiced by Ken Schatz) is an obnoxious salesman and spokesperson who usually hosts the Oxymoron commercials. The other people in the commercials do not usually expect him to show up and often demand to know who he is when he does, but he never tells them. Victor does not (or wishes not to) see the harmfulness and uselessness of his products.
 Jay (voiced by Ken Schatz) is a man who, whenever Sheep or any other main character sees a sign, is first heard reading it aloud, and when the character turns to him, he raises his glasses and says something along the lines of "I like to read" or "Reading is funducational".
 Swanky the Poodle (voiced by Stephanie D'Abruzzo) is a poodle and Sheep's love interest, who, luckily, gives Sheep some attention. Swanky is owned by Lady Richington.
 Great Scott (voiced by Ken Schatz) is a Scotsman, appearing and saying "EEE-Yeeeeeeeeesssss?" (just like the late Frank Nelson) after someone says the exclamation "Great Scott!" He was once accompanied by Holly Molly.
 News Announcers: The duo of news announcers, one a neurotic, angry man called Hank (voiced by Ken Schatz) and the other a ditsy blond female called Betsy (voiced by Stephanie D'Abruzzo), who proclaim everything oh-so unrelated as a "related story".
 Irv, the Studio Accountant (voiced by Joey Mazzarino) forces, in order to lower show expenses, the narrator to make the sounds himself and re-directs Sheep into escaping in the time machine because "so much time and money was put" into its building and re-construction.
 The Sombrero Brothers are two untalented performers in Mexican attire whose act, "Flying Sombrero Brothers", is flying on a plane. Their names are Hector (voiced by Mo Willems) and Bill (voiced by Ken Schatz).
 The Ranting Swede (voiced by Kevin Seal) is a Swedish man who rants about pianos, supermarkets, and a variety of other topics. His rants appear at the end of every single episode, except episode 18, where he was replaced by The Ranting Norwegian, due to schedule conflict and the final one, which is done in reverse order.
 The Ranting Norwegian (voiced by Kevin Seal) is a Norwegian man who does not know much about ranting but instead talks about a car he recently got, and appreciates things rather than ranting about them. Unlike the Ranting Swede, he speaks much more softly and nicely, and also explains how the people in Norway do not have too much to rant about.
 General Public (voiced by Jerry Nelson) is Private Public's father.

Production
Series creator Mo Willems began his career doing stage comedy in the 1980s, but he had also wanted to be an artist. Willems would recall this in a 2001 interview, stating, "My desire as a kid was to find a way to be funny and draw. Animation turned out to be the best way for me to do that." After graduating from New York University Tisch School of the Arts, Willems began making short films for Sesame Street and writing for The Muppets. He would also work on Nickelodeon's short-form animated series The Off-Beats, which had a similar art style to Sheep in the Big City. Willems has stated that the work of Pablo Picasso has influenced his art style.

Sheep in the Big City was broadcast alongside a number of potential series pilots during Cartoon Network's "Cartoon Cartoon Summer" marathon on August 18, 2000. The series was greenlit and would go on to broadcast for two seasons.

Style
The show usually begins with a completely unrelated clip, which turns out to be a show that Sheep is watching. Sheep presses a button on his remote to change the channel, which segues into the theme song.

Each episode is divided into three chapters, and each episode and chapter title is a pun on the word 'sheep' or a related word. In the episode "To Sheep, Perchance to Dream!", one chapter is named "Some Pun on the Word 'Sheep'".

Fake advertisements are in between the chapters, and sometimes short skits, such as the Sombrero Brothers. The fake advertisements are usually of products from Oxymoron with Victor the spokesperson promoting it. Each product is usually of low quality (contrary to what one may think) or causes pain in some way.

The show's most unusual characteristic is its frequent breaking of the fourth wall. For instance, the vast majority of the characters make references to the show's structure, script, and, occasionally, its premise. For example, in episode 8, when General Specific finally captures Sheep, the Angry Scientist states that he didn't actually have the Ray Gun ready, thinking that they would never capture Sheep due to it "being so contrary to the set-up of the show". The Narrator is also a pivotal character, frequently interacting with the characters via voice-over (and sometimes directly, when other characters unexpectedly show up in his studio). He also criticizes the television medium itself (such as the fact that two-thirds of the final episode of the first season was actually composed of dream sequences) and the script, occasionally ad-libbing when he does not quite understand the script. He also tells the viewer to "just go with it" when the script seems to make no sense.

Literal humor is also important to the show's style. Phrases and expressions such as "Hold the phone!" or "wild goose chase" are usually followed by literal interpretations of the phrase mentioned. A running gag in the show, for example, is that whenever a character exclaims "Great Scott!" a Scottish man appears and says, "Yes?" Another example is that, whenever the phrase "Hold the phone!" is said, Lisa Rentel is seen holding a phone.

Episodes

Pilot (2000)

Season 1 (2000–01)

Season 2 (2001–02)

Home media releases
The first season was available on iTunes. However, it was taken off of iTunes for unknown reasons. In the United Kingdom, three episodes (excluding the pilot) were released on a DVD in region 2 format. The pilot is on the Powerpuff Girls "Powerpuff Bluff" DVD and also on the Powerpuff Girls "Dream Scheme" VHS tape (although there was an intentional mislead on the back cover of the tape saying it has a bonus episode of fellow cartoon Courage the Cowardly Dog).

In 2022, the series became available for streaming on HBO Max in Latin America (though a few episodes are missing). Both the English and Spanish dubs of the episodes can be found on there, and they are the original NTSC masters that haven't been seen since the show was taken off the air. These HBO Max Latin America Rips have since been made available for American viewers through Google Drive ports, both the original English versions and the Spanish dubs.

Other appearances
Sheep has a cameo role in the OK K.O.! Let's Be Heroes crossover special "Crossover Nexus", as one of the many Cartoon Network heroes who is summoned and defeated by Strike.

References

External links

 
 
 Titles & Air Dates Guide
 Mo Willems Studio Webpage

2000 American television series debuts
2000s American animated television series
2002 American television series endings
American children's animated comedy television series
Cartoon Cartoons
Cartoon Network original programming
English-language television shows
Metafictional television series
Military comedy television series
Television series about sheep
Television series by Curious Pictures
Television series by Rough Draft Studios
Television shows set in Nebraska